Events from the year 1935 in Michigan.

Office holders

State office holders
 Governor of Michigan: Frank Fitzgerald (Republican)
 Lieutenant Governor of Michigan: Thomas Reed (Republican) 
 Michigan Attorney General: Harry S. Toy 
 Michigan Secretary of State: Orville E. Atwood (Republican)
 Speaker of the Michigan House of Representatives: George A. Schroeder
 Majority Leader of the Michigan Senate: 
 Chief Justice, Michigan Supreme Court:

Mayors of major cities
 Mayor of Detroit: Frank Couzens (Republican)
 Mayor of Grand Rapids: William Timmers
 Mayor of Flint: George E. Boysen
 Mayor of Lansing: Max A. Templeton
 Mayor of Ann Arbor: Robert A. Campbell

Federal office holders
 U.S. Senator from Michigan: James J. Couzens (Republican)
 U.S. Senator from Michigan: Arthur Vandenberg (Republican) 
 House District 1: George G. Sadowski (Democrat)
 House District 2: Earl C. Michener (Republican)
 House District 3: Henry M. Kimball (Republican)
 House District 4: Clare Hoffman (Republican)
 House District 5: Carl E. Mapes (Republican)
 House District 6: William W. Blackney (Republican)
 House District 7: Jesse P. Wolcott (Republican)
 House District 8: Fred L. Crawford (Republican)
 House District 9: Albert J. Engel (Republican)
 House District 10: Roy O. Woodruff (Republican)
 House District 11: Prentiss M. Brown (Democrat)
 House District 12: Frank Eugene Hook (Democrat)
 House District 13: Clarence J. McLeod (Republican)
 House District 14: Louis C. Rabaut (Democrat)
 House District 15: John D. Dingell Sr. (Democrat)
 House District 16: John Lesinski Sr. (Democrat)
 House District 17: George Anthony Dondero (Republican)

Population

Companies
The following is a list of major companies based in Michigan in 1935.

Sports

Baseball
 1935 Detroit Tigers season – Under player-manager Mickey Cochrane, the team won the 1935 World Series, defeating the Chicago Cubs, four games to two.  First baseman Hank Greenburg led the American League with 36 home runs and 168 RBIs and was selected as the American League Most Valuable Player.  Other statistical leaders on the team included second baseman Charlie Gehringer with a .330 batting average and pitcher Tommy Bridges with 21 wins and a 3.51 earned run average.
 1935 Michigan Wolverines baseball season - Under head coach Ray Fisher, the Wolverines compiled an 11–11 record. Russell D. Oliver was the team captain.

American football
 1935 Detroit Lions season – Under head coach Potsy Clark, the Lions compiled a 7–3–2 record, placed first in the NFL's Western Division and went on to defeat the New York Giants, 26–7, in the 1935 NFL Championship Game. The team's statistical leaders included Dutch Clark, who led the NFL with 55 points scored, and Ernie Caddel, who led the league with 621 yards from scrimmage and 6.4 yards per touch.
 1935 Michigan State Spartans football team – The Spartans compiled a 6–2 record under head coach Charlie Bachman and won their annual rivalry game with Michigan by a 25 to 6 score.
 1935 Detroit Titans football team – The Titans compiled a 6–3 record under head coach Gus Dorais.
 1935 Wayne Tartars football team – The Tartars compiled a 5–2–1 record under head coach Joe Gembis and shut out four of eight opponents.
 1935 Michigan State Normal Hurons football team – The Hurons compiled a 4–2–2 record and outscored opponents by a total of 43 to 41.
 1935 Western State Hilltoppers football team – The Hilltoppers compiled a 5–3 record and were outscored by opponents, 91 to 78.
 1935 Michigan Wolverines football team – The Wolverines compiled a 4–4 record under head coach Harry Kipke and finished in a tie for seventh place in the Big Ten Conference.
 1935 Central State Bearcats football team – The Bearcats compiled a 1–6 record and were outscored by a total of 101 to 32.

Basketball
 1934–35 Detroit Titans men's basketball team –
 1934–35 Michigan Wolverines men's basketball team –

Ice hockey
 1934–35 Detroit Red Wings season – Under general manager and coach Jack Adams, the Red Wings compiled a 19–22–7 record.
 1934–35 Michigan Wolverines men's ice hockey team –

Boat racing
 APBA Gold Cup – 
 Harmsworth Cup –
 Port Huron to Mackinac Boat Race –

Boxing
 Detroit's Joe Louis won 11 consecutive bouts in 1935, including a technical knockout of Primo Carnera on June 25 at Yankee Stadium and a knockout of Max Baer on September 24 at Yankee Stadium.

Golfing
 Motor City Open - 
 Michigan Open -

Other

Chronology of events

Births

 January 21 - Carol Wald, artist and illustrator known for her collages and paintings, in Detroit
 January 22 - Seymour Cassel, actor (Oscar nominee for Faces), in Detroit
 February 8 - Council Cargle, stage and film actor (Detroit 9000, Jackie Brown), in Detroit
 February 15 - Roger B. Chaffee, astronaut who died in a fire during a pre-launch test for the Apollo 1 mission, in Grand Rapids
 February 16 - Sonny Bono, part of the singing duo Sonny & Cher, producer, and politician, in Detroit
 February 17 - Bill Van Tichelt, developer of VanTech Motorcycles, in Kalamazoo
 March 11 - Nancy Kovack, actress and wife of Zubin Mehta, in Flint
 March 12 - Hugh Lawson, jazz pianist, in Detroit
 March 13 - Leon Burton, American football player for Arizona State who in 1957 led the NCAA in rushing yards (1,126 yards) and scoring (96 points), in Flint
 March 13 - Joan LeQuia, pitcher and infielder in the All-American Girls Professional Baseball League, in Negaunee, Michigan
 March 20 - Bettye Washington Greene, first African-American Ph.D. chemist to work as a professional at Dow Chemical, in Midland
 March 29 - Moby Benedict, coach of Michigan Wolverines baseball team from 1963 to 1979, in Detroit
 April 12 - Lee H. Katzin, television and film director and creator of Man from Atlantis, in Detroit
 April 13 - Michael Joseph Kaniecki, Roman Catholic Bishop of Fairbanks from 1985-2000, in Detroit
 April 19 - Hans W. Becherer, president and CEO of John Deere from 1987-2000, in Detroit
 May 18 - Ken Hamlin, Major League Baseball infielder (1957-1966), in Detroit
 May 24 - Ronald Edmonds, educator, author, and pioneer of effective schools research, in Ypsilanti
 June 17 - Rudolph G. Wilson, aka "Papa Rudy", professor, writer, storyteller, and public speaker, in Detroit
 June 19 - Sarah Goddard Power, Democratic Party activist and University of Michigan Regent, in Detroit
 June 26 - Hank Greenwald, play-by-play announcer for the San Francisco Giants from 1979 to 1996, in Detroit
 June 27 - Dan Currie, linebacker in the NFL from 1958 to 1966 (2× NFL champion), in Detroit
 July 29 - Joan Gerber, voice actress (H.R. Pufnstuf, Teenage Mutant Ninja Turtles), in Detroit
 July 31 - Theodore Weesner, author/novelist, works including The Car Thief (1972), in Flint
 August 14 - Gary Tobian, gold medal winner in springboard diving competition in 1960 Olympics, in Detroit
 August 15 - Tom Morey, aka "Y",  musician, engineer, shaper, surfer, and surf equipment designer, in Detroit
 August 20 - Stephen Yokich, labor union activist and UAW president from 1994 to 2002, in Detroit
 August 26 - Shirley E. Schwartz, chemist and research scientist for General Motors, in Detroit
 September 10 - Sammy Sessions, driver USAC Championship Car series from 1965 to 1975, in Nashville, Michigan
 October 12 - Paul Humphrey, jazz and funk/R&B drummer, in Detroit
 October 13 - Etterlene DeBarge, gospel singer and matriarch of the musical group DeBarge, in Royal Oak
 October 13 - Edgar Culbertson, recipient of Coast Guard Medal for heroism leading to his death in 1967, in Ferndale
 October 28 - Thomas J. Schriber, technology professor known for his work on "Simulation using General Purpose Simulation System", in Flint
 December 4 - Robert Vesco, fugitive criminal financier, in Detroit
 December 21 - Kurt Seiffert, gold medal winner in coxed pair rowing at 1956 Olympics, in Detroit
 December 26 - Abdul Fakir, singer and founding member of Motown's the Four Tops, in Detroit

Gallery of 1935 births

Deaths

 January 5 - Frank S. Kedzie, President of Michigan Agricultural College (1915–1921), at age 77
 January 31 - Harry Tuthill, athletic trainer for boxers and sporting teams, including the New York Giants (1904-1907), Detroit Tigers (1907-1921), and Michigan Wolverines football (1916-1917), at age 65 in Detroit
 February 2 - Clara Smith, blues singer, in Detroit
 February 19 - Zelda Sears, actress, screenwriter (The Divorcee), novelist and businesswoman, at age 62 in Hollywood, California
 March 24 - Caroline Bartlett Crane,  Unitarian minister, suffragist, civic reformer, educator and journalist, known as "America's housekeeper" for her efforts to improve urban sanitation, at age 76 in Kalamazoo
 April 2 - Edwin F. Sweet, U.S. Congressman (1911-1913), Assistant Secretary of Commerce (1913-1921), at age 86 in Ojai, California
 April 29 - William J. Olcott, iron mining and railroad executive who was captain of the University of Michigan football teams in 1882 and 1883, at age 73 in Pasadena, California
 May 21 - Sarah Killgore Wertman, first woman law student at the University of Michigan and the first woman to be admitted to the Bar of any state in the United States, at age 72 in Seattle
 October 19 - Henry M. Kimball, U.S. Congressman from Michigan's Third District, in Kalamazoo
 November 13 - Frank Navin, principal owner of the Detroit Tigers for 27 years, in Detroit
 December 25 - Horatio Earle, Michigan's first Highway Commissioner and a leader of the good roads movement, at age 80 in Detroit

See also
 History of Michigan
 History of Detroit

References